The Secret of the Forgotten City is the fifty-second volume in the Nancy Drew Mystery Stories series. It was first published in 1975 under the pseudonym Carolyn Keene. The actual author was ghostwriter Harriet Stratemeyer Adams.

Plot summary

Gold! There are rumors that long ago a treasure was hidden in a city now buried under the Nevada desert. Nancy Drew and her friends plan to join a dig sponsored by two colleges to hunt for the gold. Before she starts, the young sleuth receives an ancient stone tablet with petroglyphs on it. With this amazing clue, however, come a threat from a thief who also wants the treasure.

One harrowing adventure after another besets Nancy, George, Bess, Ned, Burt, and Dave in 102 degrees temperatures as they pursue Nancy's hunches above and below ground. They are assisted by a fine Indian woman and a young geology student, but both are unwilling participants in a strange plot. In the end Nancy and Ned nearly lose their lives, just after she has discovered the priceless hidden treasure of gold.

References

Nancy Drew books
1975 American novels
1975 children's books
Novels set in Nevada
Grosset & Dunlap books
Children's mystery novels